Dendrochilum javieriense is a species of orchid, commonly known as Javier's dendrochilum.  It is endemic to the island of Luzon in the Philippines.

References

javieriense
Orchids of the Philippines
Plants described in 1989